Metalasma is a genus of symmetrical sessile barnacles in the family Pachylasmatidae. There is one described species in Metalasma, M. crassum.

References

External links

 

Barnacles